Justus Nnaemeka Mogekwu is an Anglican bishop in Nigeria.

Mogekwu was ordained in 1990. In 2009 he became Bishop of Asaba.

Notes

Living people
Anglican bishops of Asaba
21st-century Anglican bishops in Nigeria
Year of birth missing (living people)